Maj Sjöwall (25 September 1935 – 29 April 2020) was a Swedish author and translator. She is best known for her books about police detective Martin Beck. She wrote the books in collaborative work with her partner Per Wahlöö.

Biography
Maj Sjöwall was the daughter of Margit Trobäck and CEO Will Sjöwall.

After completing school Sjöwall was employed at Åhlén & Åkerlunds publishers between 1954 and 1959, Wahlström & Widstrands publishers between 1959 and 1961 and then Esselte publishers between 1961 and 1963.

Sjöwall was best known for the collaborative work with her partner Per Wahlöö on a series of ten novels about the exploits of Martin Beck, a police detective in Stockholm. They also wrote several novels separately. In 1971, the fourth of the Beck books, The Laughing Policeman (a translation of Den skrattande polisen, originally published in 1968) won an Edgar Award from the Mystery Writers of America for Best Novel; the book was also adapted into the film The Laughing Policeman starring Walter Matthau. In 2013, Sjöwall received the fifth Lenin Award.

After the death of Wahlöö, she continued working as a translator, writing columns for magazines and as an author. With Danish author Bjarne Nielsen she in 1989 published the book Dansk Intermezzo. In 1990, she and author Tomas Ross published the thriller Kvinnan som liknade Greta Garbo.

Personal life
Sjöwall married her first husband, magazine editor Gunnar Isaksson, in 1955, and they divorced in 1958. She married again in 1959 to photographer Hans J. Flodquist; they divorced in 1962.

Sjöwall had a 13-year relationship with Wahlöö, which lasted until his death in 1975.

Sjöwall died on 29 April 2020, at the age of 84 after a prolonged illness.

Bibliography

Martin Beck novels written with Per Wahlöö
 Roseanna (1965)
 Mannen som gick upp i rök (1966)
 Mannen på balkongen (1967)
 Den skrattande polisen (1968)
 Brandbilen som försvann (1969)
 Polis, polis, potatismos (1970)
 Den vedervärdige mannen från Säffle (1971)
 Det slutna rummet (1972)
 Polismördaren (1974)
 Terroristerna (1975)

Other books
 Dansk Intermezzo (1989). Martin Beck novel written with Bjarne Nielsen.
 Kvinnan som liknade Greta Garbo (1990). Written jointly with Tomas Ross.
 Sista resan och andra berättelser (2007). Collection of short stories written by Sjöwall and Wahlöö.

Adaptations
The books about Martin Beck were adapted into several successful films, and Beck has been portrayed by several of Sweden's best-known actors. The best-known portrayal of Beck is by actor Peter Haber, who has appeared in 42 films/episodes in the role.

References

Further reading

External links 

1935 births
2020 deaths
Writers from Stockholm
Edgar Award winners
Swedish-language writers
Swedish crime fiction writers
Swedish women writers
Marxist writers
Women mystery writers
Nordic Noir writers
Swedish mystery writers